Tumblehome is a term describing a hull which grows narrower above the waterline than its beam. The opposite of tumblehome is flare.

A small amount of tumblehome is normal in many naval architecture designs in order to allow any small projections at deck level to clear wharves.

The term is also applied to automobile design, where a vehicle's sides taper inward as they go up.  This includes a roof tapering in, and curved window glass.

Origins
Tumblehome was common on wooden warships for centuries. It allowed for maximizing a vessel's beam and creating a low center of gravity (by decreasing mass above the waterline), both tending to maximize stability.  In the era of oared combat ships it was quite common, placing the oar ports as far abeam as possible, allowing maximum possible manpower to be brought to bear.

Inward-sloping sides made it more difficult to board by a vessel by force, as the ships would come to contact at their widest points, with the decks some distance apart. With the advent of gunpowder, extreme tumblehome also increased the effective thickness of the hull versus flat horizontal trajectory gunfire (as any given width material grows effectively "thicker" as it is tilted towards the horizontal) and increased the likelihood of a shell striking the hull being deflected—much the same reasons that later tank armour became sloped.

Steel warships especially of the early 1880s frequently demonstrate tumblehome, though it has been an influential factor in their design ever since their beginnings. However, France in particular promoted the design, advocating it to reduce the weight of the superstructure and increase seaworthiness by creating greater freeboard. A French yard was contracted to construct the pre-dreadnought battleship Tsesarevich along the lines of France's Jauréguiberry, which was delivered to the Russian Imperial Navy in time for it to fight as Admiral Wilgelm Vitgeft's flagship at the Battle of the Yellow Sea on 10 August 1904. The Russo-Japanese War proved that the tumblehome battleship design was excellent for long-distance navigation, but could be dangerously unstable when watertight integrity was breached. Four tumblehome s, which had been built in Russian yards to Tsesarevichs basic design, fought on 27 May 1905 at Tsushima. The fact that three of the four were lost in this battle resulted in the discontinuing of the tumblehome design in future warships for most of the 20th century.

Modern warship design

Tumblehome has been used in proposals for several modern ship projects. The hull form in combination with choice of materials results in decreased radar reflection, which together with other signature (sound, heat etc.) damping measures makes stealth ships. This faceted appearance is a common application of the principles of stealth aircraft. Most designs feature tumblehome only above deck level; the US Navy's Zumwalt-class destroyers demonstrate it above and below the waterline.

Due to stability concerns, most warships with narrow wave-piercing hulls combine tumblehome with multi-hull designs, such as the Type 022 missile boat.

In narrowboat design

The inward slope of a narrowboat's superstructure (from gunwales to roof) is referred to as tumblehome.  The amount of tumblehome is one of the key design choices when specifying a narrowboat, because the widest part of a narrowboat is rarely more than 7 feet across, so even a modest change to the slope of the cabin sides makes a significant difference to the "full-height" width of the cabin interior.

In automobile design

The inward slope of the "greenhouse" above the beltline of a motor vehicle is also called the tumblehome. An example of a car with a pronounced tumblehome is the Lamborghini Countach.  Less commonly, the inward curve of the body near the bottom may also be called a tumblehome. In 21st century automobile designs this turnunder is less pronounced or eliminated to reduce aerodynamic drag and to help keep the lower portions of the vehicle cleaner under wet conditions.

It is known in bus body design as well.

In house design
The S. A. Foster House and Stable were designed during an experimental period by Frank Lloyd Wright in 1900 and have some rare design features including Japanese-influenced upward roof flares at all of the roof peaks and on each dormer. The house and stable also incorporate an extremely rare tumblehome design throughout. The exterior walls slant inward from the base to the top. Since the interior walls are straight, the transition takes place in the exterior windows and doors which are wider at the bottom than they are at the top. The house and stable are unique examples and similar to wooden water tower construction with flared supports for added strength.

References

Footnotes

Works cited
 Forczyk, Robert (2009). Russian Battleship vs Japanese Battleship, Yellow Sea 1904–05. Osprey.  .
 Mather, Frederic G. (1885). The Evolution of Canoeing
 Pursey, H. J. (1959). Merchant Ship Construction Especially Written for the Merchant Navy
 Vaillancourt, Henri. Traditional Birchbark Canoes Built in the Malecite, Penobscot and Passamaquoddy style
 DDG-1000 Zumwalt / DD(X) Multi-Mission Surface Combatant Future Surface Combatant. GlobalSecurity.org. Modern use of tumblehome.

Shipbuilding
Automotive styling features